St Edmund Arrowsmith Catholic High School is a centre of secondary education in Ashton-in-Makerfield in the Metropolitan Borough of Wigan, Greater Manchester, England. It has around 1200 pupils and is a Leading Edge school. It is also the first Secondary School in the Wigan Borough to receive the Green Flag Award.

It is in the Catholic parish of St Oswald's with most pupils coming from Haydock English Martyrs Catholic Primary School Haydock, Sacred Heart Catholic Primary School, Hindley Green, St Oswald's Catholic Primary School, Ashton, St Benedicts Catholic Primary School, Hindley,  and other schools in the boroughs of Wigan and St Helens. Mr. Dumican is the headmaster of the school. In 2009, the school won the green flag eco-award which no other high school has. The school opened on 21 August 1961 and was formerly known as 'Blessed Edmund Arrowsmith.' It celebrated its Golden Jubilee of 50 years at a mass held at the Liverpool Cathedral on 29 June 2011.

Uniform
The school's uniform consists of a bottle green blazer, white shirt, black or dark grey trousers (for boys) or grey skirt (for girls), and dark green tie with the school crest and red and light green stripes. The prefect tie consisted of a red tie with a golden emblem. It has recently been updated to being a red tie with thin black stripes and the senior prefects having thicker, solid black stripes. The old prefect ties are now used for Y10 prefects. Shoes are black or brown and socks must be grey or black.

The PE kit is a white T-shirt with a green section around the shoulders which contains the School logo in green the PE tops must be engraved with the pupils' initials. Boys wear black shorts, which again must be personalized and the school logo here is white. Both boys and girls also wear Red and green "SEA sport" personalized with the students initials once again. Boys also have a reversible red and green rugby top, personalized, for outdoor winter sports. Girls wear black skorts which is a cross between shorts and a skirt, this like all other garments of the PE kit must be personalized. All Pupils wear either trainers or Football boots for PE with football socks also. GCSE PE or dance/performing art students wear the same kit but in an all black colour..

Notable former pupils

 Sam Gormley - Entrepreneur and Businessman 
 Coronation Street actress Jennifer James attended the school.
 Mark Edwardson - BBC North West Tonight news presenter.
 David McIntosh - Gladiators star Tornado.
 Joe Burgess (Wigan Warriors) - Rugby Player
 Oliver Gildart (Wigan Warriors) - Rugby Player
Luke Thompson (St. Helens) - Rugby Player
Harry Hesketh (Fnatic) - Esports Player

References

External links
 School Website

Secondary schools in the Metropolitan Borough of Wigan
Catholic secondary schools in the Archdiocese of Liverpool
Voluntary aided schools in England
Ashton-in-Makerfield